Chanettee Wannasaen (born 16 April 2004) is a Thai professional golfer. In 2022, she won six tournaments in Thailand before claiming her first win in Europe at the Trust Golf Links Series – Ramside Hall on the LET Access Series.

Early life 
Wannasaen was born on 16 April 2004 in Chiang Mai, Thailand.

Professional career 
Wannasaen turned professional in 2021. She won the national qualifier tournament to play in the Honda LPGA Thailand twice in 2021 and 2022.

In 2022, Wannasaen won six tournaments in Thailand, including hat-trick win for the first three Thailand Mixed series events. On 8 July, she won the Trust Golf Links Series on the LET Access Series at Ramside Hall Golf Club in Durham, England. She shot a career-best and course-record round when she carded nine-under-par 64 in the second round. Three weeks later, she finished tied for 24th at the Trust Golf Women's Scottish Open on the LPGA Tour and earned a place in the Women's British Open. In December 2022, Wannasaen earned her card for the 2023 LPGA Tour after finished tied for sixth at the qualifying school.

Amateur wins 
2019 Singha Thailand Amateur Match Play Championship
2020 National Team Ranking #5, National Team Ranking #6

Source:

Professional wins (8)

LET Access Series wins (1)

Thai LPGA Tour wins (2) 
2022 (2) Singha Pattaya Ladies Open, SAT-NSDF 5th Thai LPGA Championship

Other wins (5)
2021 (1) SAT-TWT Open Road to World Ranking
2022 (4) Thailand Mixed #1, Thailand Mixed #2, Thailand Mixed #3, SAT-TWT Open Road to World Ranking

Results in LPGA majors 

CUT = missed the half-way cut

References

External links 
 
 

Chanettee Wannasaen
LPGA Tour golfers
Chanettee Wannasaen
2004 births
Living people
Chanettee Wannasaen